Calliotropis granolirata is a species of sea snail, a marine gastropod mollusk in the family Eucyclidae.

Description
The length of the shell reaches 25 mm.

Distribution
This species occurs in the Indian Ocean off Madagascar.

References

 Vilvens C. (2007) New records and new species of Calliotropis from Indo-Pacific. Novapex 8 (Hors Série 5): 1–72.

External links
 

granolirata
Gastropods described in 1903